Bradley Ray (born 16 May 1997 in Ashford, Kent, England is a British motorcycle racer. After winning the 2022 BSB Championship, for 2023 Ray is contracted to ride in European rounds of World Superbikes.

In November 2020 Ray joined the OMG Racing team for the 2021 season, and was contracted to ride for the same team during 2022, switching from BMW to Yamaha machinery as used in 2021 by the McAMS team.

In November 2019 Ray confirmed that he would join Taylor Mackenzie at TAS BMW for the 2020 British Superbike Championship season. 

From 2017 he raced in the British Superbike Championship aboard a Suzuki GSX-R1000 for Hawk Racing sponsored by Buildbase, continuing for the 2018 and 2019 seasons, winning his first Superbike-level race on 1 April at Donington Park. He had one ride in the Moto2 class at the 2015 British GP, as wildcard entry. Ray had another wildcard entry in early 2018 at the UK round of the World Superbike Championship at Donington Park, finishing Race 1 in 14th place, and 15th in Race 2.

Selected racing achievements

 2011 - 6th, British 125cc Championship #128    (Honda RS125R)
 2012 - 7th, Red Bull MotoGP Rookies Cup #28    (KTM FRR 125)
 2012 - 2nd, British MotoStar Championship #28    (Honda RS125R)
 2013 - 11th, Red Bull MotoGP Rookies Cup #28    (KTM RC250GP)
 2013 - 15th, CEV Moto3 Championship #82    (Honda NSF250R)
 2014 - 4th, Red Bull MotoGP Rookies Cup #28    (KTM RC250GP)
 2014 - 11th, CEV Moto3 Championship #28    (FTR/KTM Moto3)
 2015 - NC, FIM CEV Moto2 European Championship #82  (FTR Moto2)
 2015 - 13th, National Superstock 600 Championship #82    (Kawasaki ZX-6R)
 2016 - 3rd, British Supersport Championship #28    (Yamaha YZF-R6)
 2017 - 11th, British Superbike Championship #28    (Suzuki GSX-R1000)
 2018 - 6th, British Superbike Championship #28    (Suzuki GSX-R1000)

Career statistics

Grand Prix motorcycle racing

By season

Races by year
(key) (Races in bold indicate pole position, races in italics indicate fastest lap)

Superbike World Championship

By season

Races by year
(key) (Races in bold indicate pole position) (Races in italics indicate fastest lap)

* Season still in progress.

British Superbike

References

External links
Bradley Ray at MotoGP.com
Bradley Ray at Red Bull Rookies

1997 births
Living people
British motorcycle racers
Moto2 World Championship riders
People from Ashford, Kent